Kitichai Preecha (born September 20, 1976), who boxes as Payak Nakornluang (พยัคฆ์ นครหลวงโปรโมชั่น), is a retired Thai professional boxer in strawweight division.

Biography & Boxing career
He was born in the town of Chandi, Chawang District, Nakhon Si Thammarat Province, southern Thailand. He started boxing at the age of 12 starting with Muay Thai. Later, he changed manager and team along with changing to professional boxing seriously in name Sainam Chandiloha (สายน้ำ จันดีโลหะ) and won Lumpinee Boxing Stadium mini flyweight champion (comparable to Thailand champion).

He later changed his manager to a new man, Suchart Pisitwuttinan of Nakornluang Promotion and Vorapong Pukprajob (Monsawan  Laemfapha) as a trainer. He made four more wins and given a chance to challenge WBC 105 pound world champion title with a Mexican holder Ricardo López in Fantasy Springs Casino, Indio, California on June 29, 1996 but he was knocked out with left uppercut in third round only.

Then he isn't desperate to challenge the world champion again with hopefully López will vacate and promoted to junior flyweight, but that don't happen in that time. Although he can beat a Thai boxer Chart Kiatpetch in the qualify fight until he finally retired.

References

External links
 

Mini-flyweight boxers
Living people
1976 births
Payak Nakornluang
Payak Nakornluang